In biochemistry, phosphorylation is the attachment of a phosphate group to a molecule or an ion. This process and its inverse, dephosphorylation, are common in biology and could be driven by natural selection. Protein phosphorylation often activates (or deactivates) many enzymes.

During respiration and photosynthesis 
Phosphorylation is essential to the processes of both anaerobic and aerobic respiration, which involve the production of adenosine triphosphate (ATP), the "high-energy" exchange medium in the cell. During aerobic respiration, ATP is synthesized in the mitochondrion by addition of a third phosphate group to adenosine diphosphate (ADP) in a process referred to as oxidative phosphorylation. ATP is also synthesized by substrate-level phosphorylation during glycolysis. ATP is synthesized at the expense of solar energy by photophosphorylation in the chloroplasts of plant cells.

Phosphorylation of glucose

Glucose metabolism 
Phosphorylation of sugars is often the first stage in their catabolism. Phosphorylation allows cells to accumulate sugars because the phosphate group prevents the molecules from diffusing back across their transporter. Phosphorylation of glucose is a key reaction in sugar metabolism. The chemical equation for the conversion of D-glucose to D-glucose-6-phosphate in the first step of glycolysis is given by:

D-glucose + ATP → D-glucose 6-phosphate + ADP

ΔG° = −16.7 kJ/mol (° indicates measurement at standard condition)

Glycolysis 

Glycolysis is an essential process of glucose degrading into two molecules of pyruvate, through various steps, with the help of different enzymes. It occurs in ten steps and proves that phosphorylation is a much required and necessary step to attain the end products. Phosphorylation initiates the reaction in step 1 of the preparatory step (first half of glycolysis), and initiates step 6 of payoff phase (second phase of glycolysis).

Glucose, by nature, is a small molecule with the ability to diffuse in and out of the cell. By phosphorylating glucose (adding a phosphoryl group in order to create a negatively charged phosphate group), glucose is converted to glucose-6-phosphate, which is trapped within the cell as the cell membrane is negatively charged. This reaction occurs due to the enzyme hexokinase, an enzyme that helps phosphorylate many six-membered ring structures. Phosphorylation takes place in step 3, where fructose-6-phosphate is converted to fructose 1,6-bisphosphate. This reaction is catalyzed by phosphofructokinase.

While phosphorylation is performed by ATPs during preparatory steps, phosphorylation during payoff phase is maintained by inorganic phosphate. Each molecule of glyceraldehyde 3-phosphate is phosphorylated to form 1,3-bisphosphoglycerate. This reaction is catalyzed by glyceraldehyde-3-phosphate dehydrogenase (GAPDH). The cascade effect of phosphorylation eventually causes instability and allows enzymes to open the carbon bonds in glucose.

Phosphorylation functions is an extremely vital component of glycolysis, as it helps in transport, control, and efficiency.

Glycogen synthesis 
Glycogen is a long-term store of glucose produced by the cells of the liver. In the liver, the synthesis of glycogen is directly correlated with blood glucose concentration. High blood glucose concentration causes an increase in intracellular levels of glucose 6-phosphate in the liver, skeletal muscle, and fat (adipose) tissue. Glucose 6-phosphate has role in regulating glycogen synthase.

High blood glucose releases insulin, stimulating the translocation of specific glucose transporters to the cell membrane; glucose is phosphorylated to glucose 6-phosphate during transport across the membrane by ATP-D-glucose 6-phosphotransferase and non-specific hexokinase (ATP-D-hexose 6-phosphotransferase). Liver cells are freely permeable to glucose, and the initial rate of phosphorylation of glucose is the rate-limiting step in glucose metabolism by the liver.

The liver's crucial role in controlling blood sugar concentrations by breaking down glucose into carbon dioxide and glycogen is characterized by the negative Gibbs free energy (ΔG) value, which indicates that this is a point of regulation with. The hexokinase enzyme has a low Michaelis constant (K), indicating a high affinity for glucose, so this initial phosphorylation can proceed even when glucose levels at nanoscopic scale within the blood.

The phosphorylation of glucose can be enhanced by the binding of fructose 6-phosphate (F6P), and lessened by the binding fructose 1-phosphate (F1P). Fructose consumed in the diet is converted to F1P in the liver. This negates the action of F6P on glucokinase, which ultimately favors the forward reaction. The capacity of liver cells to phosphorylate fructose exceeds capacity to metabolize fructose-1-phosphate. Consuming excess fructose ultimately results in an imbalance in liver metabolism, which indirectly exhausts the liver cell's supply of ATP.

Allosteric activation by glucose 6-phosphate, which acts as an effector, stimulates glycogen synthase, and glucose 6 phosphate may inhibit the phosphorylation of glycogen synthase by cyclic AMP-stimulated protein kinase.

Other processes 
Phosphorylation of glucose is imperative in processes within the body. For example, phosphorylating glucose is necessary for insulin-dependent mechanistic target of rapamycin pathway activity within the heart. This further suggests a link between intermediary metabolism and cardiac growth.

Protein phosphorylation

Protein phosphorylation is the most abundant post-translational modification in eukaryotes. Phosphorylation can occur on serine, threonine and tyrosine side chains (often called 'residues') through phosphoester bond formation, on histidine, lysine and arginine through phosphoramidate bonds, and on aspartic acid and glutamic acid through mixed anhydride linkages. Recent evidence confirms widespread histidine phosphorylation at both the 1 and 3 N-atoms of the imidazole ring. Recent work demonstrates widespread human protein phosphorylation on multiple non-canonical amino acids, including motifs containing phosphorylated histidine, aspartate, glutamate, cysteine, arginine and lysine in HeLa cell extracts. However, due to the chemical lability of these phosphorylated residues, and in marked contrast to Ser, Thr and Tyr phosphorylation, the analysis of phosphorylated histidine (and other non-canonical amino acids) using standard biochemical and mass spectrometric approaches is much more challenging and special procedures and separation techniques are required for their preservation alongside classical Ser, Thr and Tyr phosphorylation.

The prominent role of protein phosphorylation in biochemistry is illustrated by the huge body of studies published on the subject (as of March 2015, the MEDLINE database returns over 240,000 articles, mostly on protein phosphorylation).

Natural selection 

Whether natural selection has been involved in protein phosphorylation is less understood. A recent study has found that the interferon-regulatory factors family member 9 (IRF9) could be influenced by natural selection during human evolution. This gene is one of the interferon-regulatory factors. The ancestral state (Ser129) in IRF9 is more frequently found in mammals, while the derived positively selected state (Val129) was fixed in human. This fixation should occur before the "out-of-Africa" event ~ 500,000 years ago. Thus the young amino acid (Val129) may serve as a dephosphorylation site of IRF9, which may affect the immune response in human species.

See also 
 Moiety conservation
 Phosida
 Phosphoamino acid analysis
 Phospho3D

References

External links 
Functional analyses for site-specific phosphorylation of a target protein in cells (A Protocol)

Cell biology
Cell signaling
Phosphorus
Post-translational modification